The Pan-Malaysian Islamic Front (Jawi: باريسن جماعه اسلاميه سمليسيا often known by its ; acronym: BERJASA) is a  political party in Malaysia. The party is part of a Malay-Islam based coalition named "Gerakan Tanah Air" .

History

The party was founded in 1977 by the then Chief Minister of Kelantan, Mohamed Nasir as a splinter of Pan-Malaysian Islamic Party (PAS), under the persuasion and endorsement of United Malays National Organisation which was dissatisfied with the demands made by the PAS. These demands included internal squabbles for the lump share in controlling the state of Kelantan and the pressure from UMNO and Barisan Nasional (BN) soon led to PAS withdrawing from BN and 1977 Kelantan Emergency. In the following 1978 general election, the split cost the PAS a huge number of votes in Kelantan: among the 36 state seats in Kelantan, UMNO won twenty three, BERJASA won eleven, to set up the Kelantan state coalition government while PAS won only two as opposition.

BERJASA subsequently joined BN, but support for BERJASA quickly dissolved and only managed to win four seats in the subsequent 1982 general election. BERJASA stayed out of the 1986 general election as it had pulled out from BN in protest of the admission of another new splinter party of PAS, Parti Hizbul Muslimin Malaysia (HAMIM) into BN. In 1989, it joined Angkatan Perpaduan Ummah (APU) opposition parties coalition under the leadership of Parti Melayu Semangat 46 (S46). It managed to win one seats in the 1990 general election but failed to retain it in 1995 general election. APU alliance was subsequently dissolved in 1996 after Tengku Razaleigh Hamzah decided to dissolve it and rejoin UMNO. Since then, BERJASA only maintained minimal and nearly inactive participation in the political fray, as evidenced from their participation in subsequent general elections.

In the 2013 general elections (GE13), in spite of the party empowered by the NGO of Malaysian Muslim Solidarity or Ikatan Muslimin Malaysia (ISMA) leaders; who contested under the ticket of BERJASA but all had lost as candidates. Some of the ISMA leaders has joined BERJASA to remain active in politics since.

BERJASA president Dr Mustapa Kamal Maulut in announcing plan to contest the approaching 2018 general elections (GE14), had controversially declared it's a  'Cooperative' party in order to attract potential voters who are also cooperative members, with contentious claim it's trying to develop the nation economy through the cooperative which were refuted by the Angkatan Koperasi Kebangsaan Malaysia Bhd (ANGKASA) and Suruhanjaya Koperasi Malaysia (SKM). The party received a facelift in 2016 then when it joined Gagasan Sejahtera (GS), an informal alliance of opposition parties led by the PAS together with Parti Ikatan Bangsa Malaysia (IKATAN). In GE 14, under GS alliance BERJASA contested using PAS logo in three parliamentary seats, namely in Cameron Highlands, Selayang and Tanjung Piai and in the state seats of Sungai Manik and Batu Kurau. The party failed to win any of the seats, with all of their candidates losing their deposits. Feeling betrayed by PAS in GE14, in the 2019 Tanjung Piai by-election, BERJASA fielded its president, Prof Dato' Dr Badrulhisham Abdul Aziz to contest on its own banner ignoring the GS alliance. but only obtained 850 votes to finish forth, in the six-cornered fight for the parliamentary seat.

In September 2020, BERJASA officially unveiled "purple" as the party's new colours in line with its rejuvenation process to be a more vigorous and energetical party in facing a challenging political survival and forthcoming general election (G15). Ustaz Zamani Ibrahim has been elected as the BERJASA president beginning 27 March 2021. The apparent ISMA link has verified the speculations the NGO is taking over the political party to be its political vehicle amidst ISMA's denial.

General election results

State election results

See also
 Mohamed Nasir
 1977 Kelantan Emergency
 Malaysian Muslim Solidarity
 Politics of Malaysia
 List of political parties in Malaysia

References

External links

 
 

 
Political parties in Malaysia
1977 establishments in Malaysia
Political parties established in 1977
Islamic political parties in Malaysia
Conservative parties in Malaysia
Islamic organisations based in Malaysia
Social conservative parties